Events from the year 2017 in Saint Lucia

Incumbents
 Monarc: Elizabeth II
 Governor-General: Pearlette Louisy
 Prime Minister: Allen Chastanet

Events

Deaths

17 March – Derek Walcott, poet and playwright, Nobel laureate (b. 1930).

References

 
Years of the 21st century in Saint Lucia
Saint Lucia
Saint Lucia
2010s in Saint Lucia